Solitary is a 2020 British sci-fi thriller film written, directed, and produced by Luke Armstrong.

Cast
 Johnny Sachon as Issac
 Lottie Tolhurst as Alana
 Michael Condron as Ken Bradley
 Brian Bovell as Harry
 Ben Valentine as Pundit Chris
 Lydia Cherry as Clara

References

External links
 

2020 films
British science fiction thriller films
2020s English-language films
2020 science fiction films
2020 thriller films
2020s science fiction thriller films
2020s British films